Haji Zakaria bin Muhammad Amin (March 1913 – January 1, 2006) was an Indonesian ulama, politician, and writer. He was the first generation of charismatic ulama in Bengkalis Regency, and was the first person to be appointed as the head of Islamic religious administration in Bengkalis. Zakaria was the son in law of Tuan Guru Haji Ahmad, the first ulama in Bengkalis Regency. 

Born in Bangkinang as the first child of Muhammad Amin and his wife Taraima, Zakaria began his education at Tweede Inlandsche School, and continued his study in Mecca. He then performed hajj along with his maternal aunt, and later moved to British Malaya, after completed his study. He continued study for six years to Muhammad Saleh until his death in 1929, and later moved to Bengkalis with his friends.

Early life 
Zakaria bin Muhammad Amin was born in March 1913 in Bangkinang, Kampar, He was the eldest child of the three children of Muhammad Amin and Taraima. He has three brothers and two sisters: Hasyim bin Muhammad Amin, Ahmad bin Muhammad Amin, Siti Mariam binti Muhammad Amin, Syarafiah Norwawi binti Muhammad Amin (1935–2002), and Ahmad Sanusi bin Muhammad Amin; three of them are paternal half-siblings.

Her father worked as a trader, and her mother worked as a seamstress. Zakaria spent his childhood herding buffalo in the rice fields. He began his schooling in 1920 at Tweede Inlandsche School, a public school during the Dutch colonialism in Bangkinang. In 1923, along with his maternal aunt, Fatimah, he traveled to Mecca.

After arrived in Mecca, he then performed the hajj. Zakaria continued his education by studying with the scholars in Mecca like Ali Al-Maliki, Syekh Umar Al-Turki, Umar Hamdan, Ahmad Fathoni, and Syekh Muhammad Amin Quthbi. He then studied various of islamic knowledge such as Interpretation of the Quran, Hadith, Tawhid, Arabic literature using Halaqa method.

After completed his study in Mecca, Zakaria moved to Temerloh, Pahang, and continued his islamic knowledge study for six years to Muhammad Saleh, until Saleh's death in 1929. Zakaria then studied Matan Jurumiyah, an arabic science book. He then moved to Kuala Lipis, a district in Pahang, until it flooded in late 1929.

After Kuala Lipis was flooded, Zakaria with his friends moved to Bengkalis, the capital city of Bengkalis Regency, Riau. He then continued his islamic study to Tuan Guru Haji Ahmad, the first ulama in Bengkalis Regency. He then moved to Bagan Datuk, Perak, after his marriage with Ahmad's daughter, Mariah, in 1933.

Military career 
During Japanese occupation of the Dutch East Indies, he led the resistance movement along with nationalists in Bengkalis.

On Dutch Military Aggression II, Zakaria led the resistance movement in Bengkalis as a captain. After the soldier moved to Dumai, he joined and continued to lead resistance movement, and later received the titular mayor title.

Scholarly career 

Zakaria started his career as a preacher and teacher at Parit Bangkong Mosque in Parit Bangkong, Bengkalis, at the age of 16.  

In 1929, after returning from Malaysia, he began to wrote two books: Balqurramhi fi Sunniyyati Qunut Subhi (1930), and Kumpulan Khutbah Jumat dan Hari Raya Sebanyak Dua Belas Judul Khutbah (1939). This two books discuss about Zakaria's opinion regarding the issue of Salah, which became the subject of academic discussion at that time.

In 1937, along with Tuan Guru Haji Ahmad, he established Al-Khairiyah, a first Islamic boarding school in Bengkalis Regency. Al-Khairiyah was then successful due to multitude students came from various regions in Riau, studying there. He continued preaching and teaching his student at Al-Khairiyah and at various mosque in Bengkalis. After Japanese occupied the Dutch East Indies in 1942, Al-Khairiyah was closed.

In 1948, he was appointed to become the first head of Islamic religious administration in Bengkalis. From 1950 until 1972, he was the head of Ministry of Religion in Bengkalis, and was the first person to held the position. He later became a jury for the district level of Musabaqah Tilawatil Quran in Bengkalis, from 1964.

On July 17, 1963, Zakaria established MDTA Mahbatul Ulum, a Islamic school for children and youth levels. This school has six classroom at the beginning of construction, which then used for teaching various Islamic knowledge such as Nahwu Shorof, Fiqh, Tawhid, Akhlaq, Hadith, Tarikh, and Interpretation of Quran, with a classical education method. Mahbatul Ulum was reportedly success in motivating the younger generation to became a preacher, it also used as a place to celebrated religious events in Bengkalis. The school floor was renovated in 1977 by Bengkalis regent, Himron Saheman, at a cost of Rp 350.000 (USD 23).

Political career 
Zakaria was a member of Masyumi Party until it was banned on August 15, 1960, by President Sukarno, for supporting the PRRI Rebellion. He was a member of the People's Representative Council (DPR) in Bengkalis. When Central Sumatra became a stronghold of PRRI, Zakaria was one of the Bengkalis delegation at Riau DPRDS conference on August 7, 1955, who signed the petition for the former Riau residency to be separated from Central Sumatra. It was later successful because on August 9, 1957, Indonesian government issues Emergency Law Number 19 of 1957, who made Central Sumatra divided into three provinces, Riau, Jambi and West Sumatra. 

From 1974 until 1986, he worked as a councilman, represented United Development Party. He also worked as a administrator of Nahdlatul Ulama in Bengkalis Regency.

Marriage and family relationships 
 Zakaria married his first wife Mariah binti Ahmad in 1933. Mariah is the daughter of Tuan Guru Haji Ahmad and Rohimah binti Sani, Zakaria's teacher. Their marriage lasted until Mariah's death in 1955, due to illness after the events of Dutch military aggression II. The couple had seven children.
 Nashruddin Zakaria (April 10, 1934 – January 1, 1999), was Zakaria's oldest son, who was a civil servant at Ministry of Religion in Bengkalis Regency. He married to Nursiah binti Muhammad Yasin and has had four children from this marriage.
 Aminah Zakaria (September 17, 1938 – July 15, 2011), was Zakaria's oldest daughter. She worked as a teacher and was one of the female principals in Bengkalis. She was married to Rustam and has had two sons from this marriage.
 Zaharah Zakaria (February 1, 1942 – October 29, 2007), was Zakaria's second daughter. She worked as a politician, represented Golkar. She was married to Muhammad Yaqub and has had four children from this marriage.
 Ulfah Zakaria (born April 14, 1943), is Zakaria's third daughter. She formerly worked as a nurse at RSU Manado Medical Center in Manado, North Sulawesi. She was married to Diponegoro Dilapanga and has had three children from this marriage.
 Azra'ie Zakaria (July 31, 1947 – July 19, 2019), was Zakaria's second and favorite son. He was a writer, preacher, and scholar at Assyafiiyyah Islamic University in Pondok Gede District, Bekasi, and was the author of Ibnu Sahnun: Pemikir Pertama Islam (2008), along with his wife. She was married to Athiah Muhayat and has had three children from this marriage.
 Hanim Zakaria (born September 11, 1950), is Zakaria's fourth daughter. She worked as a teacher in Pekanbaru, Riau. She is married to Mokhtar and has had two daughters from this marriage.
 Syakrani Zakaria (born November 23, 1952), is Zakaria's third and youngest son from his marriage with Mariah. He worked as a harbormaster in Bengkalis. He is married to Rosnetti and has had four children from this marriage.

 Zakaria married his second wife, Siti Zainab binti Kimpal, 27 years his junior, in 1956. Zainab was an Indonesian actress and singer from Ratu Asia Troupe. Their marriage lasted until Zakaria's death in 2006, due to diabetes. The couple had seven children.
 Zulkarnain Zakaria (born August 17, 1957), is Zakaria's fourth and oldest son from his marriage with Zainab. He worked as a agricultural employee in Pekanbaru, Riau. He is married to Mistiatiningsih and has had three children from this marriage.

Bibliography

Death and legacy 

Zakaria died at his residence in Kelapapati, Bengkalis, on January 1, 2006, due to diabetes at the age of 92. He was buried at Taman Makam Islam Harapan in Kelapapati, Bengkalis, on the same day.

Zakaria remained as one of the charismatic ulama from the first generation in Bengkalis.

Citations

References 

1913 births
2006 deaths
Indonesian Islamic religious leaders
Indonesian Sunni Muslims
Indonesian educators
Indonesian imams
People from Riau